Samuel Birch (born 10 May 1963) is a Liberian sprinter. He competed in the men's 100 metres at the 1988 Summer Olympics.

References

1963 births
Living people
Athletes (track and field) at the 1988 Summer Olympics
Liberian male sprinters
Olympic athletes of Liberia
Place of birth missing (living people)